Pila is a genus of large freshwater snails with an operculum, African and Asian apple snails, aquatic gastropod mollusks in the family Ampullariidae, the apple snails.

Distribution 
Distribution of the genus Pila include Africa, Madagascar, southern Asia and Indo-Pacific islands. It is amphibious in nature and can undergo summer sleep or aestivation under drought condition. It is generally found in lakes, pools, and sometimes even in the river streams where aquatic vegetation like Vallisneria, Pistia are found in large amount for food.

External Features
When viewed from ventral side facing the collumella towards the observer, the collumella rotates clockwise or Dextral.

Species
Species within the genus Pila include:

subgenus Pila
 Pila africana (v. Martens, 1886)
 Pila ampullacea (Linnaeus, 1758) - type species
 † Pila assermoensis (Jodot, 1953)
 Pila brohardi (Granger, 1892)
 † Pila busserti Harzhauser & Neubauer in Harzhauser et al., 2017 
 Pila cecillei (Philipi, 1848)
 † Pila celebensis (Quoy & Gaimard, 1834)
 † Pila colchesteri Cox, 1933 
 Pila decocta (Mabille, 1887)
 † Pila falloti (Jodot, 1953) 
 † Pila faujasii (Serres, 1829) 
 † Pila gauthieri (Jodot, 1953) 
 Pila globosa (Swainson, 1822)
 Pila gracilis (I. Lea, 1856)
 Pila mizoramensis Sil, Basak, Karanth & Aravind, 2021
 † Pila mutungi Van Damme & Pickford, 1995 
 † Pila neuberti Harzhauser & Neubauer in Harzhauser et al., 2016 
 Pila nevilliana (Annandale & Prashad, 1921)
 Pila occidentalis (Mousson, 1887)
 Pila ovata (Olivier, 1804)
 Pila pesmei (Morelet, 1889)
 Pila saxea (Reeve, 1856)
 Pila scutata (Housson, 1848) 
 Pila speciosa (Philippi, 1849)
 Pila turbinis (I. Lea, 1856)
 Pila virens (Lamarck, 1822)
 Pila virescens (Deshayes, 1824)
 Pila wernei (Philipi, 1851)

subgenus Turbinicola Annandale & Prashad, 1921
 Pila aperta (Prashad, 1925)
 Pila (Turbinicola) saxea (Annandale & Prashad, 1921)

Synonyms
 Pila aldersoni Pain, 1946: synonym of Pomacea aldersoni (Pain, 1946) (original combination)
 Pila angelica (Annandale, 1920): synonym of Pila celebensis (Quoy & Gaimard, 1834)
 Pila conica (Wood, 1828): synonym of Pila scutata (Mousson, 1848)
 Pila gradata (E. A. Smith, 1881): synonym of Pila ovata (Olivier, 1804)
 Pila hollingsworthi T. Pain, 1946: synonym of Pomacea hollingsworthi (Pain, 1946) (original combination)
 Pila polita (Deshayes, 1830): synonym of Pila virescens (Deshayes, 1824)
 † Pila selvensis (Vidal, 1917) †: synonym of † Selvovum selvense (Vidal, 1917)

Ecology
Pila species are a host of a trematode Multicotyle purvisi.

Human use
The shells of Pila are used in traditional ethnomedicine for weakness by Saharia people in Rajasthan, India.

Pila ampullacea and Pila pesmei are some of the rice field snail species traditionally eaten in Thailand that have been displaced by the invasive golden apple
snail, Pomacea canaliculata.

References

External links 
  Swainson, W. (1840). A treatise on malacology or shells and shell-fish. London, Longman. viii + 419 pp.
 Repelin, J. (1902). Description des faunes et des gisements du Cénomanien saumâtre ou d'eau douce du Midi de la France. Annales du Musée d'histoire naturelle de Marseille. Section de Géologie. 7: 1-133
  Lamarck, J.B.M. (1799). Prodrome d'une nouvelle classification des coquilles, comprenant une rédaction appropriée des caractères géneriques, et l'établissement d'un grand nombre de genres nouveaux. Mémoires de la Société d'Histoire Naturelle de Paris. 1: 63-91
 Montfort P. (Denys de). (1808-1810). Conchyliologie systématique et classification méthodique des coquilles. Paris: Schoell. Vol. 1: pp. lxxxvii + 409 [1808. Vol. 2: pp. 676 + 16 ,1810]
 Cowie, R. H. & Thiengo, S. C. (2003). The apple snails of the Americas (Mollusca: Gastropoda: Ampullariidae: Asolene, Felipponea, Marisa, Pomacea, Pomella): A nomenclatural and type catalog. Malacologia. 45(1): 41-100.
 Cowie R.H. (2015). The recent apple snails of Africa and Asia (Mollusca: Gastropoda: Ampullariidae: Afropomus, Forbesopomus, Lanistes, Pila, Saulea): a nomenclatural and type catalogue. The apple snails of the Americas: addenda and corrigenda. Zootaxa. 3940(1): 1-92
  enson, W. H. (1829). Description of the animal of Ampullaria, a genus of freshwater Testacea, with a notice of two species inhabiting the freshwaters of the Gangetic Provinces. Gleanings in Science. 1(2): 52-54.

Ampullariidae